Qualicum Beach station is a former railway station in Qualicum Beach, British Columbia. The station was a stop on Via Rail's Dayliner service, which ended in 2011. It is located two blocks from the centre of town and 1 km from the beach.

References

External links 

Via Rail stations in British Columbia
Disused railway stations in Canada